Go Kyung-pyo (born June 11, 1990) is a South Korean actor and comedian. He gained recognition for his role in the television series Reply 1988 (2015–16) and has since starred in Don't Dare to Dream (2016) and Chicago Typewriter (2017). Go starred in his first leading role in KBS2's Strongest Deliveryman in August 2017.

Career

2010–2014: Beginnings and SNL Korea
Go made his acting debut in 2010, and became a cast member of live sketch comedy show Saturday Night Live Korea for its first three seasons. Since then, he has featured in the sitcom Standby (2012) and dramas My Cute Guys (2013) and Naeil's Cantabile (2014).

2015–present: Rising popularity and leading roles
Go gained wider recognition with his roles in Reply 1988 (2015) and Don't Dare to Dream (2016). He received the "New Star Award" at the 2016 SBS Drama Awards for his role in the latter.

In 2017, Go starred in tvN's fantasy-romance drama Chicago Typewriter alongside Yoo Ah-in and Im Soo-jung. The same year, he was cast in his first leading role in KBS's drama Strongest Deliveryman alongside Chae Soo-bin. He then starred in medical thriller drama Cross which premiered in January 2018.

After a two-year hiatus, Go made his comeback in the 2020 JTBC drama Private Lives as an imposter. In 2021, Go made cameo appearances in the tvN Drama My Roommate Is a Gumiho and Netflix series D.P.

In 2022, Go appeared in Park Chan-wook's mystery film Decision to Leave and is set to star in the comedy film 6/45 and Netflix film Seoul Vibe.

Personal life
Go enlisted for his mandatory military service on May 21, 2018. He was discharged on January 15, 2020.

Filmography

Film

Television series

Web series

Television show

Music video appearances

Discography

Soundtrack

Awards and nominations

References

External links

 
 
 

South Korean male film actors
South Korean male television actors
1990 births
Living people
People from Incheon
Konkuk University alumni